Laṛám  is the name of the eighth month of the Afghan calendar. It occurs in the autumn season (from October 22/23 to November 20/21). It has 30 days.

Laṛám corresponds with the troáical Zodiac sign Scorpio. Laṛám means "scorpion" in Pashto.

Observances 
 United States Navy Day - 5 or 6 Laram
 Republic Day in Turkey - 6 or 7 Laram
 Birthday of the Royal Marines and Czech Independence Day and anniversary of the foundation of Czechoslovakia - 6 or 7 Laram
 Halloween and Reformation Day - 9 Laram
 October Revolution Day (former), Day of Military Honour on the anniversary of the 1941 October Revolution Parades (current) - 16 Laram
 Victory Day (Azerbaijan) - 17 Laram
 United States Marine Corps birthday - 19 or 20 Laram
 Remembrance Day (Commonwealth)/Veterans Day - 20 or 21 Laram 
 Remembrance Sunday (Great Britain) - Third Sunday of Laram
 Volkstrauertag - Last Sunday of Laram

Pashto names for the months of the Solar Hijri calendar

ps:لړم(مياشت)